Bacchisa tonkinensis is a species of beetle in the family Cerambycidae. It was described by Breuning in 1956. It is known from Vietnam.

References

T
Beetles described in 1956